A by-election was held for the Victorian Legislative Assembly seat of Burwood on 11 December 1999. The by-election was triggered by the resignation on 2 November of Jeff Kennett, the sitting Liberal member and Premier of Victoria until his government was defeated in the 1999 state election on 18 September.

Bob Stensholt, Kennett's Labor opponent in the state election, won the seat on a swing of 10.4 percent, aided by the Liberals losing 15 percent of their primary vote from two months earlier.

Results

References

External links
Burwood District By-Election 1999 , Victorian Electoral Commission

1999 elections in Australia
Victorian state by-elections
1990s in Victoria (Australia)